Francis Spitzer (born 1947) served as Prefect of Saint Pierre and Miquelon from 25 October 1999 to 1 February 2001. Prior to that role, he was Deputy Prefect of Security on Corsica He has also been the director of the cabinet of the prefect of the Ardennes.

References

Living people
1947 births